Gustavo Mhamed (28 January 1977 – 9 February 2022) was an Argentine professional football player and coach who played for Vélez Sarsfield, Huracán and Defensa y Justicia, and later coached at Quilmes. Mhamed died from colon cancer on 9 February 2022, at the age of 45. His son Lucas Mhamed is also a professional footballer.

References

1977 births
2022 deaths
Argentine footballers
Club Atlético Vélez Sarsfield footballers
Club Atlético Huracán footballers
Defensa y Justicia footballers
Quilmes Atlético Club non-playing staff
Footballers from Buenos Aires
Association football coaches
Deaths from colorectal cancer
Deaths from cancer in Argentina